Bothrops jararacussu, commonly known in English as the jararacussu, is a highly venomous pit viper species endemic to South America.

Description and behavior 
The jararacussu is a fairly large pit viper; growing up to 2.2 meters long, with a robust body and head and very aggressive behavior. The color of the body and head varies widely, the background color can be brown or yellow almost black, the pattern of dark and light scales are constituted in a series of dark arches, the spots form on the dorsal midline, which look like a letter x. It has medium-sized eyes, with elliptical pupils vertically. With dorsal scales strongly keeled.

They have large fangs with 2.5 cm, and can inject a lot of venom. They usually feed on amphibians and rodents. They are ovoviviparous, giving birth to between 16 and 20 young, in the rainy season. Mainly diurnal and nocturnal, they usually warm up in the morning sun and venture forth to hunt at night.

Geographic range
It is found in South America in coastal Brazil (from Bahia to Santa Catarina), Paraguay, southeastern Bolivia, and northeastern Argentina (Misiones Province). They can be found in the atlantic forest and semi-deciduous forest. They also live in perennial forests, pine forests in Paraná in low swampy regions and along river banks.

Common names
In Brazil, Bothrops jararacussu is known by many common names, among which are the following: jararacuçu, jararacuçu-verdadeiro, patrona, surucucu, surucucu-dourada, surucucu-tapete, urutu-dourado, and urutu-estrela. Elsewhere in South America it is called Yarara-cussu, Yarara dorada, Yarara guasu, Yarara guazu, Painted Yope and Yoperojobobo.

Venom
Like all other species in the genus Bothrops, the jararacussu has rather potent venom, potent enough to kill sixteen people. The venom contains cytotoxins, hemotoxins and myotoxins, one study with 29 bites of jararacussu in the state of São Paulo, Brazil. Severe signs of local and systemic envenoming such as necrosis, shock, spontaneous systemic hemorrhage and renal failure were observed in patients bitten by specimens over 50 cm. Smaller specimens were more likely to cause blood incoagulability. Fourteen patients developed coagulopathy, six had necrosis (causing amputation of one) and five had abscess. Two were in shock, while four developed kidney failure. Three patients aged 3, 11 and 65 years died due to respiratory and circulatory failure, even with large doses of specific anti-venom management in an intensive care unit. The autopsy of two patients showed acute tubular necrosis, cerebral edema, hemorrhagic rhabdomyolysis at the site of the bite and disseminated intravascular coagulation. One survivor had chronic renal failure, whose autopsy showed bilateral cortical necrosis.

Cerebral hemorrhage and kidney failure  have already been reported, in a man bitten by a young jararacussu. The LD50 value is 0.14 mg/kg (intravenous injection), 4.92 mg/kg (subcutaneous injection) and 2.73 mg/kg (intraperitoneal injection), while the venom yield is 1000 mg, enough to kill 10,163 rats. Two myotoxins with PLA2 structure, BthTX-I and BthTX-II were isolated from the venom of B. jararacussu, BthTX-I induces various effects such as edema, degranulation of mast cells, irreversible blocking of muscle contraction, rupture of liposomes, and cytotoxicity on muscle cells and endothelial, while BthTX-II induces edema and leukocyte migration.

References

Further reading
 Lacerda, J.P. 1884. Leçons sur le venin des serpents du Brésil et sur la méthode de traitement des morsures venimeuses par le permanganate de potasse. Lombaerts & C. Rio de Janeiro. 194 pp. (Bothrops jararacussu, p. 8.)

External links

jararacussu
Snakes of South America
Reptiles of Argentina
Reptiles of Bolivia
Reptiles of Brazil
Reptiles of Paraguay
Reptiles described in 1884